Melese flavimaculata is a moth of the family Erebidae. It was described by Paul Dognin in 1899. It is found in French Guiana, Ecuador, Peru and Costa Rica.

References

 

Melese
Moths described in 1899
Arctiinae of South America